Pteropurpura festiva, commonly known as the festive murex, is a species of predatory sea snail, a marine gastropod mollusk in the family Muricidae, the rock snails. Native to the Eastern Pacific, these sea snails grow to 34–67 mm in length. 

This species was previously known as Murex festivus. Because the shell of this sea snail is attractive, and is common in San Diego, the name The Festivus was used for the San Diego Shell Club publication, which was started in 1970, became a science journal on malacology, and as of 2021 has been published for over 50 years.

Description
The length of the shell varies between 20 mm and 67 mm.

The elongately ovate shell contains six convex whorls with three low, reflexed varices per whorl. These varices are finely frilled on front. Between these varices, a rib shows a large, blunt knob on the shoulder. The wide outer lip is finely dentate with 5-7 teeth inside. The columella is simple and smooth. The oval aperture shows a varix extenting to the short, deep and recurved siphonal canal.

The ground color of the shell varies from white to light brown, crossed by evenly spaced, thin, incised, spiral dark brown lines

It is a formidable predator on mussels, limpets, barnacles and other snails. But through this biotic characteristic, it is responsible for resistance to the Asian mussel (Musculista senhousia) invasion in Southern California.

Distribution
This marine species occurs abundantly in the intertidal zone and mud flats off Southern California, USA (with most records from Santa Barbara, Los Angeles and San Diego) to Baja California, Mexico

References

 Hinds, Richard Brinsley. The Zoology of the Voyage of HMS Sulphur: Under the Command of Captain Sir Edward Belcher During the Years 1836-42. Vol. 3. Smith, Elder, 1844.
 J. Hertz & C. M. Hertz, 2006. The Festivus, the making of a scientific journal The Festivus 38(5): 53-57
 D’Attilio, A. & B. Myers 1983. The genus Pteropurpura Joussemme, 1880 (Muricidae: Ocenebrinae). The Festivus XV(ll): 111-112.
 Tuskes P. & Tuskes A. (2016). Native Pteropurpura of the eastern Pacific (Muricidae). The Festivus. 48(4): 211-220
 Morris, H. Robert, Donald P. Abbott & Eugene C. Haderlie 1990. Intertidal Invertebrates of California. Stanford University Press, Stanford, CA. Chapter 1 3 Prosobranchia: Marine Snails. Pp. 230-307.
 Tuskes, Paul M. & Ann Tuskes 2009. Influence of Habitat on Growth and Prey Selection of Pteropurpura festiva, the Festive Murex. The Festivus. 41(3): 25-29.

External links
 

Muricidae
Gastropods described in 1844